WCPM (1280 AM) was a radio station licensed to Cumberland, Kentucky, United States.  The station, owned by Cumberland City Broadcasting, Inc. signed off on August 31, 2016, after serving the area for 65 years. Its studios were on Keller Street in downtown Cumberland.

The station's license was cancelled by the Federal Communications Commission on December 19, 2018.

References

External links
FCC Station Search Details: DWCPM (Facility ID: 14729)
FCC History Cards for WCPM (covering 1950-1979)

Defunct radio stations in the United States
CPM
Radio stations disestablished in 2016
2016 disestablishments in Kentucky
CPM

Radio stations established in 1951 
1951 establishments in Kentucky